Antonio Creus i Rubín de Celis (28 October 1924 – 19 February 1996) was a motorcycle racer and racing driver from Spain. He participated in one Formula One World Championship Grand Prix, the 1960 Argentine Grand Prix on 7 February 1960, driving a privately entered Maserati 250F. He retired with electrical problems and exhaustion, and scored no championship points.

He died in his native Madrid in 1996.

Complete Formula One World Championship results
(key)

References

1924 births
1996 deaths
Spanish racing drivers
Spanish Formula One drivers
Sportspeople from Madrid
Spanish motorcycle racers
350cc World Championship riders